A meatotomy is a form of penile modification in which the underside of the glans is split, extending the urinary meatus. The procedure may be performed by a doctor to alleviate meatal stenosis or urethral stricture. A meatotomy is sometimes also self-performed voluntarily for aesthetic reasons, or to open the urethra for sexual gratification as part of the practice of sounding.

Procedure

A variety of techniques may be used to make the cut, but a doctor will generally crush the ventral meatus, urethra, and upper frenulum for 60 seconds with a straight Kelly hemostat and then divide the crush line with fine-tipped scissors. Other techniques include cauterisation, cutting with a scalpel (sometimes aided by clamps), or by using existing fistulas from it to tie off the area to be cut. Most self-performed modifications tend to use a clamp and cut method.  Depending on the anatomy of the individual and the extent of the split, meatotomy performed with a scalpel may involve heavy bleeding, while crush and cauterisation methods are relatively bloodless.  Regardless of the procedure used, meatotomies, like other genital modifications and genital piercings, heal quickly.  Unlike other genital modifications, the glans tissue does not have a tendency to re-adhere to itself or heal closed.

A meatotomy may be extended to subincision or genital bisection, which are both much more complex and serious modifications.

Effects
Aside from the exposure of previously internal tissues, the newly enlarged urethral opening may hinder the ability to control the direction and shape of one's urine stream.  This may result in messy urination and require that the meatotomized individual sit while urinating; however, this is not universally true.  The larger urethral opening may also reduce the velocity of ejaculate, thereby reducing distance of ejaculation.

Individuals who have been meatotomized for sexual gratification report that the exposed surface area of the glans penis and access to the spongy urethra for sounding creates heightened physical pleasure.

Repair of a meatotomy can be painful and difficult, and is similar to hypospadias repair.

See also
 Penile subincision
 Body modification

Notes
Specific

Bibliography

External links
 Body Modification E-Zine encycyclopedia entry on meatotomy 

Male genital modification
Human penis
Urethra disorders